The Oakway Center is a shopping center in Eugene, Oregon. It is one of the three shopping malls in the area. The annual sales are $1 to 2.5 million (D&B: $1,300,000). Oakway Center is anchored by Bed Bath and Beyond, Nordstrom Rack, Old Navy, and Trader Joe's.

It opened in 1966 as Oakway Mall, with an Albertsons supermarket, Tiffany's Drugstore, and Oakway Department Store as anchors. The Oakway Department store closed after only six years and was subdivided. Albertsons moved to a new store in 1990 and converted to TJ Maxx the same year. After Tiffany's closed in 1998, it became a Borders Books & Music, which closed in 2011 and was rumored to become an H&M. TJ Maxx moved across the street in 2005 and was subdivided among other retailers, including White House/Black Market.
In 2013 Nordstrom Rack announced that they would open a new store where Borders Books & Music was located.

On May 21, 2020, it was announced that Pier 1 Imports would be closing all stores, including the Oakway Center location.

See also
List of shopping malls in Oregon

References

Shopping malls in Oregon
Buildings and structures in Eugene, Oregon
Tourist attractions in Eugene, Oregon
Shopping malls established in 1966
1966 establishments in Oregon